Autolinee Toscane S.p.A. (also known as at) is a private Italian company, wholly owned by RATP Dev, active in the local public transport sector. It manages several urban and suburban bus lines in Tuscany for a total of 1.7 million kilometres travelled annually.

It is part of a temporary association of companies ColBus together with MAS+, the latter owned by F.lli Alterini, S.A.M. and F.lli Magherini, and holds 33% of the company Li-nea, also owned by ATAF Gestioni and Cooperativa Autotrasporti Pratesi.

Public tender
The Regione Toscana projected in 2010 the reform of the local public transport by road, to guarantee economic and social sustainability to the sector for the coming eleven years, with a public tender, to appoint a sole agent to manage the local public transport in Tuscany.
The Region and ONE Scarl, the consortium born on 21 December 2017 formed by twelve public transport operators (ATAF&Li-nea, Autolinee Chianti Valdarno, Autolinee Mugello Valdisieve, BluBus, CAP Autolinee, Consorzio Pisano Trasporti, CTT Nord, Etruria Mobilità, PiùBus, Siena Mobilità, Tiemme Toscana Mobilità, Vaibus), signed an agreement on 29 December 2017 to fulfil the transitional period pending the opinion of the European Court of Justice and the Council of State for the assignment of the public transport services to a single company occurred with a public tender.
Following several appeals, the takeover of local operators has been postponed various times until 1 November 2021 when Autolinee Toscane became the single operator in the Region.

Assets
Autolinee Toscane operate the following transporting assets as of 1 November 2021:

 4,827 employees
 1,051 urban buses
 153 suburban buses
 1,521 intercity buses
 37,538 bus stop
 35 ticket offices
 3,000 ticket dealers
 440 urban bus routes
 57 depots
 565 suburban bus routes toward 307 comuni
 24,527 km of lines
 110,865,333 km to cover yearly
 2 Funicular (Montenero funicular and Certaldo funicular)

Routes

Vehicles
Autolinee Toscane fleet is really varied as it derives from the merger of twenty-two transport companies with different needs by territory and routes. AT is planning to renew the fleet acquiring 2,095 buses over a period of ten years.

As the average age of the vehicles is higher, about half has more than 15 years of activity, AT decided to purchase immediately new buses in 2022; it will make an investment of 40 million euros to buy 223 new urban and suburban buses.
As of August 2022 has been purchased the following models.

New buses
Conecto
Fifty Mercedes-Benz Conecto have been purchased and put into service in the region main cities. 
The new livery is completely white and the "Autolinee Toscane" blue logo on the back, front and side it is applied to the new urban buses.
Intouro
The livery is blue and the "Autolinee Toscane" white logo on the back, front and side is applied to the new suburban buses.
Crafter
Three Volkswagen Crafter minibuses were delivered on 25 May 2022 to operate in the historic center of Montepulciano. The Crafters have been modified by Carind International of Campello sul Clitunno specialized in changing transport vehicles according to the required needs.

Crossway
Indcar Mobi
Five  buses were acquired to be operated in the narrow streets of city centre of Lucca. All the buses are equipped with Euro 6 engines.
Kent
AT launched a tender for acquiring 250 new buses in three years time and Otokar resulted the winner of the purchase tender.
Vectio

Fares
Tickets
Autolinee Toscane has adopted two single urban fares in the entire Region: Urbano Capoluogo issued in the Capital of Provinces and Urbano Maggiore in the others main centres both for a 70 minutes (90 in Florence) validness. A multi-trip tickets carnet with ten tickets is on sale.
Passes
Various unlimited passes are available as needed, after an online registration, according to the type and the chosen period (monthly, quarterly or annual). No card is released and the control is carried out exhibiting the Tessera sanitaria.
Elba Pass
Autolinee Toscane has released the Elba Pass that allows to discover the Elba travelling on the public transports. The card has a validity for one, three or six days and permit to go around unlimited on all buses.

Innovation
Autolinee Toscane has started the installation of 1,013 display at bus stops throughout the Region. The new smart bus stop, produced by the Swedish company Axentia, is the latest generation in the electronic displays that will ensure a gradual evolution of the technologies applied to the stops of the local public transport network. The bus stop displays has a compact design, don't require power cable or antenna and the maintenance is reduced to the replacement of the battery every five years. The project has been brought forward compared to the program and is carried out in parallel with the installation of the newest AVM systems on the entire fleet that will provide the information of the passages in real time.

See also
 List of bus operating companies

References

External links

Transport companies of Italy
Public transport in Italy
Italian companies established in 1996
Companies based in Tuscany
Bus companies of Italy
RATP Group
Transport in Tuscany
Bus transport in Italy